Carabus elysii is a species of ground beetle in the Carabinae subfamily that is endemic to China. The species have black back and dark reddish pronotum.

Subspecies include:
 Carabus elysii elysii
 Carabus elysii magnificens
 Carabus elysii pulcher

References

elysii
Beetles described in 1856
Endemic fauna of China